Lagen David Atuka is a politician from Uganda who is the member of 11th Parliament of Uganda from Agago Constituency. In the current election he got 9,300 votes and succeeded Makmot Otto who got 8,700 votes.

References 

Members of the Parliament of Uganda
Year of birth missing (living people)
Living people